The Amateur-Oberliga Berlin was the second tier of the German football league system in the city of West Berlin in Germany from 1947 until the formation of the Bundesliga in 1963, operating under the name of Amateurliga Berlin. After 1963, it was the third tier until 1991, when the league was disbanded. In 1974, the league changed its name from Amateurliga Berlin to Amateur-Oberliga Berlin.

Overview
The league was formed under the name of Amateurliga Berlin in 1947 as the second tier of play in the then still united city of Berlin, below the "old" Oberliga Berlin.

The league operated with two groups in the 1947-48 season, split into four groups the year after, returned to two in 1949-50 and run in one single group from then onwards. After this season, the East Berlin clubs left the Berlin league system to join that of East Germany instead.

It consisted of twelve teams from 1950, with the two first placed clubs gaining promotion to the Oberliga and the two bottom placed teams being relegated to the Landesliga. The number of clubs was extended to fifteen in 1952, with a third team being relegated from then on. In 1959, the number of clubs was extended to sixteen.

With the introduction of the Bundesliga in 1963, the "old" Oberliga Berlin was disbanded and the new second-tier Regionalliga Berlin became the highest league in the city of West-Berlin, absorbing most of its clubs. Three clubs from the Amateurliga Berlin were admitted to the new Regionalliga in 1963, these being the Blau-Weiß 90 Berlin, Union 06 Berlin and Reinickendorfer Füchse.

The league continued with sixteen clubs and three relegated teams but only one promotion spot now to the Regionalliga. With the enlargement of the Regionalliga in 1965, six clubs from the Amateurliga were admitted and a second promotion spot was granted to the league from then on. In 1969, a seventeenth club was added, the year after an eighteenth.

With the introduction of the 2nd Bundesliga Nord and the disbanding of the Regionalliga Berlin in 1974, the Amateurliga became the highest league in Berlin, still as the third tier of the German league system. Nine of the twelve clubs from the Regionalliga went to the Amateurliga which meant that the Amateurliga clubs placed ninth to eighteens were relegated to the Landesliga to keep the number of teams in the league to eighteen. With the reorganization of the Regionalligas in 1974, the league was renamed Amateur-Oberliga Berlin.

From 1974, the champions of the Amateurliga had to take part in a promotion play-off to determine the teams promoted to the 2nd Bundesliga. In 1976, the league was reduced to sixteen clubs. Unlike the other Oberliga champions, the winner of the Berlin league was not directly promoted to the 2nd Bundesliga after this but had to play out a series against the runners-up of the Oberliga Nord, which they lost both times, in 1979 and 1980.

The inception of a single 2nd Bundesliga in 1981 meant no team was promoted from the Oberligas that year and after 1981, the Oberliga Berlin champion had to play-off with the winners of the Oberligas Nord, Westfalen and Nordrhein.

With the German reunion came the reorganization of the football in former East Germany. The Oberliga Berlin was disbanded and its clubs spread between the NOFV-Oberligas Nord and Mitte. The teams placed fifteens and sixteenth went to the new Verbandsliga Berlin.

League champions
The league champions:

Source:

Placings in the league 1963 to 1991 
The complete list of clubs in the league and their final placings:

 1 In 1973 SC Tasmania 1900 Berlin went bankrupt and was reformed as Tasmania 73 Berlin . In 2001 the club changed its name to SV Tasmania-Gropiusstadt 1973. In 2011 the club changed its name to SV Tasmania Berlin.
 2 In 1986 Hertha BSC Berlin II had to withdraw from the league due to the relegation of the first team.
 3 In 1988 Lichterfelder SU merged with FV Brandednburg-Lichterfelde to form VfB Lichterfelde. In 2004 the club changed its name to Lichterfelder FC.

Key

Founding members of the Amateurliga Berlin
The first proper season of the Amateurliga Berlin took place in 1950, after the East German clubs had left and the league was reduced to one group only. The founder members of this league were:

VfL Nord Berlin 
BFC Nordstern 
VfL Schöneberg
Hertha Zehlendorf 
Frohnauer SC 
Steglitzer SC Südwest 
SC Tegel 
SC Charlottenburg 
SC Staaken 
BSC Rehberge Berlin 
Alemannia 06 Haselhorst 
Hakoah Berlin

Disbanding of the Oberliga Berlin
The league was disbanded in 1991, its clubs spread between the new NOFV-Oberligas Mitte and Nord and the Verbandsliga Berlin.

To the NOFV-Oberliga Nord:
Tennis Borussia Berlin
Spandauer SV
Reinickendorfer Füchse
Spandauer BC
Wacker 04 Berlin
BFC Preußen Berlin

To the NOFV-Oberliga Mitte:
Hertha BSC Berlin II
Türkiyemspor Berlin
VfB Lichterfelde
Hertha Zehlendorf
Türkspor Berlin
NSC Marathon 02
SC Charlottenburg
Blau-Weiß 90 Berlin II
SC Gatow
FV Wannsee

To the Verbandsliga Berlin:
Rapide Wedding
SV Tasmania 73 Neukölln

The Berlin-Liga (formerly Verbandsliga Berlin) is now the highest league in the city of Berlin. The NOFV-Oberliga Mitte existed for only three seasons, then its clubs were spread between the other two NOFV-Oberligas, Nord and Süd. All clubs on this level based in Berlin now play in the northern group.

References

Further reading
 kicker Almanach - The yearbook on German football from Bundesliga to Oberliga, first published: 1937, published by the Kicker Sports Magazine
 "Deutschlands Fussball in Zahlen" - An annual publication with tables and results from the Bundesliga to Verbandsliga/Landesliga, publisher: DSFS
 Die Deutsche Liga Chronik 1945-2006, Section F: Berlin and the Northeast region, publisher: DSFS, published: 2006

External links
  Berlin Football Association (BFV) 
  Das Deutsche Fussball Archiv Historic German league tables

Berlin
Football competitions in Berlin
1963 establishments in West Germany
1974 disestablishments in West Germany
Sports leagues established in 1963
Sports leagues disestablished in 1974
Ger